Nodens Ictus are a British electronic music band formed in 1986 as a spinoff of British psychedelic rock band Ozric Tentacles.

History

Nodens Ictus began life in 1986 when Ozric Tentacles guitarist Ed Wynne and keyboardist Joie Hinton were asked by the promoters of the Crypt club in Deptford, South London, to produce an ambient set for the club's "chillout" room.

Essentially Ozric Tentacles minus the guitar and rhythm section, Nodens Ictus explored ethereal, Tangerine Dream-like soundscapes using synths and samples, in contrast to the driving space-rock which characterised the sound of parent band. The limited-run, independent cassette-only album The Grove of Selves was issued in 1987 - sold initially at gigs and by mail order, it has subsequently become a rare and sought-after item of Ozric memorabilia.

Existing as a side-project only, Nodens Ictus played semi-frequently throughout the late '80s and early '90s, often as a support act at Ozric shows. The band occasionally ventured into electronica/dance territory following the addition of Ozric drummer Merv Pepler to the lineup, until being put on the backburner for nearly a decade as Wynne focused on the increasingly commercially successful Ozrics. Pepler and Hinton meanwhile concentrated on their techno-trance act Eat Static, which had become successful enough in its own right for them to leave the Ozrics permanently in 1994.

Nodens Ictus returned in 2000 with the release of Spacelines, a collection of old and new studio tracks along with a handful of live cuts dating back as far as 1988. Released on the Ozrics' own Stretchy Records label, the album generated reasonable interest, and Nodens Ictus soon returned to the live arena, again as an occasional support act at Ozric gigs, most notably at their "Pongmaster's Ball" extravaganzas held in London in 2002, 2004 and 2006. An appearance at the Glastonbury Festival was made in 2003, and Nodens Ictus continued with a pair of small-scale headline shows in Exeter and London in 2005.

2007 saw the band play at the Solfest in Cumbria, alongside Mixmaster Morris and System 7.

MantisMash joined the band as a touring member in 2014. Wynne's son, Silas Neptune, joined the band as a full time member in 2017.

Nodens Ictus released their third album, The Cozmik Key, on 10 December 2017.

The double CD Live at Kozfest 2018 was released in April 2019.

Band members

Current members
Ed Wynne - guitars, synthesizers
Silas Neptune - synthesizers

Previous members
Joie Hinton - synthesizers
Merv Pepler - synthesizers

Touring members
MantisMash - synthesizers, mixing

Discography

Albums
The Grove of Selves (1987)
Spacelines (2000)
The Cozmic Key (2017)

Known "bootleg" recordings
Club Dog 1988#
Angel Centre, Tonbridge 1989#
Scala Cinema 1989#
Live 1990#
Brixton Fridge 1991#
The Empire, Shepherds Bush, London 29-03-02#
Live Phoenix Arts Centre 16-01-03#

Note: There are a collection of recordings circulating on the internet called "climbing trees and waterfalls" (CTAW), which many people erroneously believe to have been recorded by Nodens Ictus. The CTAW recordings were in fact created by a collection of musicians from the Stoke-on-Trent area in the UK. Details are sketchy but information on early copies of the CTAW recordings list the band members as Mark - Guitar & synth, Will - Drum programming, sampling & mixing and Lance - Sampling, Occasional vocals. Definitely nothing whatsoever to do with Nodens Ictus.

References

External links

Nodens Ictus at Allmusic
Nodens Ictus at ProgArchives
Nodens Ictus at Discogs

English electronic music groups
English dance music groups
British ambient music groups